Goodger is a rural locality in the South Burnett Region, Queensland, Australia. In the  Goodger had a population of 187 people.

Geography 
Boonenne is a neighbourhood in the north-west of the locality.

History 
The locality was named after the Goodger railway station on Tarong railway line, after the Goodger brothers (George, James and Howard A.) who were pioneer selectors.

The name Boonenne is a corruption of an Waka word boon-u-inn meaning myrtle tree. The name was assigned as a railway station name by Queensland Railways Department on 25 September 1914.

Stratharlie State School opened in 1915. In 1917, it was renamed Goodger State School. It closed on 10 August 1962. It was at Kingaroy Cooyar Road. The old school building is still on the site.

The district was the only area in Queensland with known kaolin deposits of economic importance between 1950 and 1986, and it consequently supplied all kaolin produced in the state. The earliest workings, known as Campbell's Pit, were in the south west of the locality. 

Economy 
A granite quarry operates in the central west of the locality.

References 

South Burnett Region
Localities in Queensland